Shenzhen Capital Group Co., Ltd (SCGC)  is a state-owned venture capital company based in Shenzhen, China. It is affiliated with the Shenzhen Government and its investments cover industries supported by national policies. According to South China Morning Post, from January 2019 to May 2020, it was the second most active venture capital firm in China.

Background 
SCGC was established by the Shenzhen Government in 1999. The firm is considered one of China's most active investors in hard technology. Most of its investments are in Chinese companies. More than 200 companies in its portfolio have gone public.

Notable investments 

 Desktop Metal
 Semiconductor Manufacturing International Corporation
 Jinko Solar
 BGI Group
 NetDragon Websoft
 Xiami Music Network
 Formlabs
 Makeblock
 Le Vision Pictures

References

External links
 www.szvc.com.cn (Company Website)
 

Chinese companies established in 1999
Companies based in Shenzhen
Financial services companies established in 1999
Private equity and venture capital investors
Venture capital firms of China